The Archdeacon of Teviotdale was the head of the Archdeaconry of Teviotdale, a sub-division of the Diocese of Glasgow. He was one of two archdeacons serving the Bishop of Glasgow. As the name describes, this archdeacon was responsible for the Teviotdale region of the Scottish Borders region. The position was an important position within the medieval Scottish church; because of the high number of parish churches in the archdeaconry.

List of archdeacons of Teviotdale
 Peter de Alinton  1238–1242
 Reginald de Irvine  1242–1245
 Nicholas de Moffat,  1245–1270
 William Wishart,  1288–1297 x 1308
 Roger de Welleton, 1307–1310
 William de Hillum, 1312
 William de Yetholm  1320 x 1321–1329
 John de Berwick, x 1354
 John de Boulton, 1354
 Henry de Smalham, 1354–1358 x 1364
 John de Ancrum, 1364–1393
 Thomas de "Mathane", 1394
 John de Merton, 1394–1400 x 1404
 John Forrester, 1418
 William Croyser, 1418–1440 x 1443; 1446 x 1451–1460 x 1461
 John de Scheves, 1418–1419
 John Lyon, 1418–1418 x 1423
 Edward de Lauder, x 1419
 Alexander de Foulertoun, 1422 x 1424
 John Bowmaker, x 1424–1428
 Andrew de Hawick, 1424–1425
 John Benyng, 1426
 William Croyser
 James Croyser, 1440
 Walter Blair, 1441–1447
 Patrick Hume, 1443–1472
 Alexander Inglis, 1471
 John Lichton, 1472
 David Luthirdale, 1474–1475
 John Whitelaw, 1475
 Nicholas Forman, 1478 x 1479
 James Doles, 1478
 John Brown, 1479
 William Elphinstone junior, 1479–1481
 William Elphinstone senior, 1481 x 1482–1486
 John Martini, 1486 x 1491 (?), x 1510
 William Ker, 1491,1510–1511
 George'Berber', 1509
 George Lockhart, 1509 x 1520–1533
 Thomas Ker, x 1534
 John Lauder, 1534–1551
 John Hepburn, 1544–1564 x 1565
 Robert Richardson, 1552–1565
 Thomas Ker, 1565–1569

Notes

Bibliography
 Watt, D.E.R., Fasti Ecclesiae Scotinanae Medii Aevi ad annum 1638, 2nd Draft, (St Andrews, 1969), pp. 174–9

See also
 Archdeacon of Glasgow
 Bishop of St Andrews

Teviotdale
History of the Scottish Borders
People associated with the Scottish Borders
13th-century establishments in Scotland